The 2009 Lehigh Mountain Hawks football team was an American football team that represented Lehigh University during the 2009 NCAA Division I FCS football season. Lehigh tied for second in the Patriot League.

In their fourth year under head coach Andy Coen, the Mountain Hawks compiled a 4–7 record. B.J. Benning and Matt Cohen were the team captains.

The Mountain Hawks were outscored 234 to 230. All of their losses, however, were to non-conference opponents, and their 4–2 conference record placed them in a three-way tie with Colgate and Lafayette for second in the Patriot League standings. 

Lehigh played its home games at Goodman Stadium on the university's Goodman Campus in Bethlehem, Pennsylvania.

Schedule

References

Lehigh
Lehigh Mountain Hawks football seasons
Lehigh Mountain Hawks football